Robert Austin Thomson (12 July 1907 – 17 Sep 1937) was a Scottish footballer, who played for Celtic, Blackpool, Motherwell and Scotland.

Career

Club
Born in Johnstone, Renfrewshire, Thomson joined Celtic aged 22 from Glasgow Perthshire, traditionally a Junior team but in that era a member of the rival Intermediate Association, a breakaway body protesting the compensatory payments given by senior clubs signing Junior players. With Thomson on an intermediate contract, he and Celtic were taken to court by Perthshire for breach of agreement after his move in 1929.

At Celtic Park, where he was brought in to replace Paddy Connolly as a supplier for prolific goalscorer Jimmy McGrory, Thomson became a popular figure with supporters for his exciting and determined play on the right wing. In the 1931 Scottish Cup Final against Motherwell, his run and cross set up a late equalising goal to force a replay, and in the second match he scored twice in a 4–2 victory. He was in the side which won the trophy again in 1933 with a 1–0 win over the same opposition.

However, an excessive lifestyle off the field caused problems with his fitness and form, and a resulting dispute with the club management led to his departure soon after that second cup win. Following a short spell in English football with Blackpool, he returned to Scotland with Motherwell but again suffered from physical problems and retired from the game aged 27.

International
He gained one full cap for Scotland in October 1931, a 3–2 win over Wales in the British Home Championship, in which he scored the second goal. He made his second and last appearance for the Scottish League XI a week later, having first played for them a year earlier.

Death and personal life
Thomson died suddenly from heart failure in 1937, aged 30, leaving a wife and two young children.

He was not related to Celtic teammates and fellow Scotland internationals Alec Thomson (an inside forward who was his partner on the right flank in over 100 matches) or John Thomson (a goalkeeper who died from a head injury during a match aged 22).

References

Sources

External links

1907 births
1937 deaths
Scottish footballers
Association football wingers
Scotland international footballers
Celtic F.C. players
Blackpool F.C. players
Motherwell F.C. players
Scottish Football League players
Scottish Football League representative players
English Football League players
Glasgow Perthshire F.C. players